The Spreckels Sugar Company is an American sugar beet refiner that for many years controlled much of the U.S. West Coast refined sugar market. It is currently headquartered in Brawley, California.

History
The Spreckels Sugar Company was founded by entrepreneur, industrialist, newspaper publisher, and railroad executive Claus Spreckels (1828–1908) in February 1899. He founded the company town of Spreckels, California, just south of the city of Salinas, California, in 1897, but his descendants began to relinquish control when they started selling homes in the community to the public c. 1925. In 1891, Henry O. Havemeyer, who controlled The American Sugar Refining Company (The Sugar Trust), bought half of the stock of the Western Sugar Company, thus giving his company control of the Hawaiian sugar and of the markets west of the Mississippi River. When it was completed in 1899, Spreckels' "Factory 1" was the largest sugar refinery in the United States and the third-largest in the world. Shipping to and from the plant was mostly by a private Spreckels-owned narrow-gauge railroad system connecting to the docks at Moss Landing, California.

On Claus Spreckels' death, his second son Adolph B. Spreckels (1857–1924) assumed the management of Spreckels Sugar Company. Adolph's wife's nephew, Charles Edouard de Bretteville, eventually took over as head of the company and in 1949 led a group that purchased control. In 1963, the family sold their interests to Amstar. In 1987, a management team bought out the Spreckels Sugar Division; in 1996, it was sold to Imperial Holly Corp. of Sugar Land, Texas, who owned it until 2005 when it was sold to Southern Minnesota Beet Sugar Cooperative of Renville, Minnesota.

Spreckels Boulevard outside Salinas, as well as Spreckels Road outside King City, California and Spreckels Boulevard in Manteca, California, still bear witness to the mark Spreckels Sugar made in the area.

American author John Steinbeck worked on ranches owned by Spreckels Sugar throughout the Salinas Valley in the early 1920s.

See also 
 Spreckelsville, Hawaii: a company town

References

External links
 
 

 

Sugar companies of the United States
Companies based in Imperial County, California
History of Monterey County, California
Salinas Valley
Food and drink companies established in 1899
1899 establishments in California
Business in Hawaii